Doctor Ibrahim al-Marashi is an associate professor at California State University, San Marcos, researching modern Iraqi history. He holds a doctor of philosophy in history from Oxford University (2004), where his thesis was on the Iraqi Invasion of Kuwait; a master's degree in political science from Georgetown University, which he had received in 1997; and a bachelor's degree in history and Near Eastern studies from the University of California Los Angeles.

He is best known as the author of an article which was plagiarised by the British government in a 2003 briefing document entitled Iraq: Its Infrastructure of Concealment, Deception and Intimidation (see Dodgy Dossier). This document was a follow-up to the earlier September Dossier, both of which concerned Iraq and weapons of mass destruction and were ultimately used by the government to justify its involvement in the 2003 Invasion of Iraq.  Large portions of al-Marashi's paper were quoted verbatim by then United States Secretary of State Colin Powell to the U.N. General Assembly.

The material plagiarised from Marashi's work and copied nearly verbatim into the "Dodgy Dossier" was six paragraphs from his article Iraq's Security & Intelligence Network: A Guide & Analysis, which was published in the September 2002 issue  of the Middle East Review of International Affairs. Tony Blair's office ultimately apologised to Marashi for its actions, but not to the MERIA journal. 

Marashi worked as a visiting faculty member at Sabancı University in Istanbul, Turkey from 2004 until 2006.  Prior to this he was a research associate at the Center for Nonproliferation Studies (CNS) at the Monterey Institute of International Studies, as well as a lecturer at the Center for Contemporary Conflict (CCC). Additionally, he had previously worked at the Center for Middle Eastern Studies at Harvard University on a project classifying captured Iraqi state documents.

He has lived at various times in Saudi Arabia, Yemen, Egypt and Morocco.

See also
David Kelly
Alastair Campbell
Iraq Dossier

References

External links
Dan Snow on Channel 4 News report on the plagiarism
"Iraq's Security & Intelligence Network: A Guide & Analysis" in Middle East Review of International Affairs, vol. 6, no. 3, September 2002
MERIA journal's response to the plagiarism
Video: Ibrahim explains how the plagiarism was discovered and subsequent events in his life—a fascinating story.

Year of birth missing (living people)
Living people
Alumni of the University of Oxford
21st-century American historians
21st-century American male writers
Georgetown University alumni
Harvard University staff
American Shia Muslims
Iraqi Shia Muslims
Iraqi expatriates in the United Kingdom
Iraqi emigrants to the United States
University of California, Los Angeles alumni
University of Pennsylvania faculty
American male non-fiction writers
Historians of Iraq